St Martin of Tours is a parish church in Detling, Kent.  Dedicated to Martin of Tours, the building was constructed in the 12th century with 13th and 15th-century additions and restoration carried out in the late 19th century. It is a Grade I listed building.

The nave and chancel are of early Norman construction and built of flint with a plain tiled roof. The aisle to the north of the nave is Early English  and is constructed of flint and local rag-stone. It was enlarged in the 1880s. The adjacent chapel on the north side of the chancel and the porch on the south side of the nave are Perpendicular Gothic. The tower is built in two stages of galletted rag-stone with diagonal corner buttresses. The timber-shingled broach spire was added in 1861 by R. C. Hussey. The roof structure to the chapel is original, but the rest of the roof was replaced in the 19th century.

The church windows are of varying sizes and periods although mostly perpendicular in style. Over the doorway on the west side of the tower is a large rectangular three-lighted perpendicular window added in the 19th century. The windows to the nave, aisle and chapel are mainly two-lighted in design. Those to the south-east and east of the chancel and three-lighted. Internally, the nave and aisle are separated by a pair of wide plain arches and the chancel and chapel by a single arch.

The large twelve-sided font is early and plain and stands on a 20th-century base, having once been built into the wall of the tower. An ornately carved four-sided oak lectern dates from 1340–50. It probably came from Boxley Abbey and has been described as "the finest medieval fitting in any parish church in the county". The church's pipe organ dates from the 1850s and was brought from the Congregational Church in Maidstone in 1973.

The churchyard contains a headstone and a table tomb that are Grade II listed.

See also
Grade I listed buildings in Maidstone

References

Borough of Maidstone
12th-century church buildings in England
Grade I listed churches in Kent
Church of England church buildings in Kent
Diocese of Canterbury